Kleandro Lleshi (born 9 October 1999) is an Albanian footballer who plays as a central midfielder for Spanish Segunda División RFEF club Mar Menor.

Club career
Born in Lezhë, Lleshi started his career at his home country before moving to Portugal in 2016 and joining C.F. Os Belenenses. In September 2017, he moved to CD Leganés and was initially assigned to the under-20 squad.

Lleshi made his senior debut with Leganés' B-team on 11 February 2018, playing the last 13 minutes in a 1–2 Tercera División away loss against RSD Alcalá. He scored his first goal fourteen days later, netting the opener in a 5–0 away routing of CDF Tres Cantos.

In August 2019, after being a regular starter for Leganés B during the 2018–19 season, Lleshi was loaned to Segunda División newcomers CF Fuenlabrada for one year. He made his debut for the club on 17 December, starting in a 1–0 away win against Peña Sport FC for the season's Copa del Rey.

On 22 January 2020, Lleshi was loaned to Recreativo de Huelva in Segunda División B until the end of the campaign. On 10 August, he signed a one-year deal with FC Cartagena, newly-promoted to the second division, on a free transfer.

Lleshi made his professional debut on 27 March 2021, coming on as a late substitute for Pablo Clavería in a 1–1 home draw against Málaga CF. After another two first team appearances, he left the Efesé in July 2021 as his contract expired.

On 18 January 2022, Lleshi signed with Segunda División RFEF club Mar Menor FC, as a free agent.

References

External links
 Kleandro Lleshi profile at FSHF.org
 
 
 

1999 births
Living people
People from Lezhë
Albanian footballers
Association football midfielders
Segunda División players
Segunda División B players
Segunda Federación players
Tercera División players
CD Leganés B players
CF Fuenlabrada footballers
Recreativo de Huelva players
FC Cartagena footballers
FC Cartagena B players
Mar Menor FC players
Albania youth international footballers
Albanian expatriate footballers
Albanian expatriate sportspeople in Portugal
Albanian expatriate sportspeople in Spain
Expatriate footballers in Portugal
Expatriate footballers in Spain